Bullanga is a genus of antlions belonging to the family Myrmeleontidae.

Species:

Bullanga binaria 
Bullanga florida 
Bullanga insolita

References

Myrmeleontidae
Myrmeleontidae genera